Thylacodes squamolineatus is a species of sea snail, a marine gastropod mollusk in the family Vermetidae, the worm snails or worm shells.

Distribution

Description
The maximum recorded shell length is 60 mm.

Habitat
The minimum recorded depth for this species is 400 m; the maximum recorded depth is 400 m.

References

Vermetidae
Gastropods described in 2002